Melavelithottam is a village in the Thanjavur taluk of Thanjavur district, Tamil Nadu, India.

Demographics 

As per the 2001 census, Melavelithottam had a total population of 8081 with 4110 males and 3971 females. The sex ratio was 966. The literacy rate was 87.81.

References 

 

Villages in Thanjavur district